Scott Urick (born July 15, 1977) is a lacrosse coach and former professional player. Urick was a high school all-American and won two Virginia state championships while playing for Robinson High School.  He attended Georgetown University, where he was captain of the Hoyas team in both his junior and senior years.

He currently serves as Assistant Director of Athletics and Varsity Lacrosse Head Coach at Georgetown Prep. He previously served as an assistant coach for the Hoyas under his father, longtime head coach Dave Urick.

MLL career
Urick played professionally in Major League Lacrosse (MLL) for nine seasons. Playing for the New Jersey Pride and the Chesapeake Bayhawks, he retired in 2009 as the third all-time leading goal scorer in MLL history.

Team USA
Urick played for the 2006 U.S. Men's National Team in World Lacrosse Championship and lead the team in goals.

Statistics

MLL

Awards
Urick was the MVP of the 2002 Major League Lacrosse All-Star Game.
Urick won the Bud Light Skills Competition Accuracy Contest Winner, 2002, and 2004.
Urick was an All-American selection in 1999 and 2000.
Urick was inducted into the Georgetown University Athletic Hall of Fame in 2019.

References

1977 births
Living people
American lacrosse players
Chesapeake Bayhawks players
Georgetown Hoyas men's lacrosse players
Major League Lacrosse players
Robinson Secondary School alumni